The St. Louis Cardinals Hall of Fame Museum is a team hall of fame located in downtown St. Louis, Missouri, representing the history, players and personal of the professional baseball franchise St. Louis Cardinals of Major League Baseball (MLB).  It is housed within Ballpark Village, a mixed-use development and adjunct of Busch Stadium, the home stadium of the Cardinals. To date, 47 members have been enshrined within the Cardinals Hall of Fame.

History
The St. Louis Cardinals Hall of Fame Museum was originally located in downtown St. Louis in the same building as the International Bowling Museum and the World Bowling Writers International Bowling Hall of Fame, near the site of the old Busch Stadium and the new Busch Stadium.  The International Bowling Museum closed its St. Louis site in November 2008 and moved to Arlington, Texas.

The Cardinals Hall of Fame likewise closed when the Bowling Museum moved and suspended public operations.  However, the museum staff designed a new hall of fame and museum.  The Cardinals moved the museum to the St. Louis Ballpark Village, which is located across Clark Street from Busch Stadium and opened in 2014.  The new facility was constructed within the Cardinals Hall of Fame and Museum and Cardinal Nation Restaurant in Ballpark Village.

Voting criteria and process

In January, 2014, Cardinals chairman and chief executive officer William DeWitt, Jr., announced a plan for an annual formal Cardinals Hall of Fame induction process.  Included components of the voting and induction process are a "Red Ribbon" committee of baseball experts, a six-week fan voting process in the spring, and an enshrinement ceremony in the summer.  All former Cardinals already enshrined in the National Baseball Hall of Fame and Museum in Cooperstown, New York and those honored with their number retired were automatically enshrined into the inaugural class of the Cardinals Hall of Fame on August 16, 2014.

To be eligible for the Cardinals Hall of Fame, a player must have played three seasons for the Cardinals and have been retired from Major League Baseball for at least three years.  Players are divided into two categories – "modern players" and "veteran players."  Players who have been retired 40 or more years are classified as veteran players.  Each year, a "Red Ribbon" committee selects one veteran player to be inducted and nominates another 6 to 10 players for a fan vote.  The vote is then accomplished on the Cardinals official MLB.com website.  The two players with the highest online vote total are inducted.  Additionally, the team may opt to elect personnel who fulfilled other roles besides playing, such as a coach, broadcaster or front office personnel.  The team creates and displays a plaque for each elected member of the Hall. The plaques are created by the same company that creates the plaques for the National Baseball Hall of Fame in Cooperstown.  Each inductee is also provided with a red jacket that is to be worn at all official team ceremonies and functions.  A total of 26 members were inducted for the first class of 2014. Beginning in 2021, only one modern player will be elected each year

Cardinals Hall of Fame inductees

Positions that are listed were played the equivalent of a full season for the Cardinals.

Players who have been nominated, but not inducted, include Joaquín Andújar, Steve Carlton, David Freese, George Hendrick, Matt Morris, Édgar Rentería, and Lee Smith.

Selected artifacts
The Cardinals Hall of Fame and Museum contains over 15,000 total artifacts and 80,000 photographs, second only to the National Baseball Hall of Fame as the largest collection of baseball antiquities.  The museum includes a variety of displays and features on the Cardinals' former ballparks, the old St. Louis Browns and Negro League St. Louis Stars, championship teams, uniform history, and current players. Patrons can take part in interactive displays such as recording a broadcast call of a classic Cardinals play, or holding a bat used in a game by a Cardinals star of the past. It also features a special exhibit area that hosts a new display each season: these collections have included media related to the history of the Cardinal farm system, the life and career of Stan Musial, the team's radio partnership with KMOX, and the 2011 World Series team. On home game weekends, the Museum has additional programming such as autograph sessions, panel discussions with former players or staffers, and special presentations of unique memorabilia from their archives.

Championship memorabilia
 A baseball autographed by the 1926 World Series-winning team, including an autograph from Babe Ruth, playing for the opponent the New York Yankees.
 A 1931 World Series championship ring in its original green case that was awarded to Sparky Adams
 A program from the first and only all-St. Louis World Series, played in 1944 against the Browns (now the Baltimore Orioles)
 The original Commissioner's Trophy awarded to the 1967 championship team, when the Cardinals defeated the Boston Red Sox

See also
 List of St. Louis Cardinals in the Baseball Hall of Fame
 
 List of St. Louis Cardinals team records
 History of the St. Louis Cardinals: 1875–1919 • 1920–52 • 1953–89 • 1990–present
 National Baseball Hall of Fame and Museum
 Missouri Sports Hall of Fame
 Monument Park (Yankee Stadium) for a similar dedication by the New York Yankees to honor its achieved players.

References

External links
 St. Louis Cardinals Hall of Fame webpage

St. Louis Cardinals
Major League Baseball museums and halls of fame
Halls of fame in Missouri
Sports museums in Missouri
History museums in Missouri
Museums in St. Louis
Hall of Fame
Awards established in 2014
Museums established in 2014
2014 establishments in Missouri
Downtown St. Louis